Tone Tiselj (born 21 September 1961) is a Slovenian handball coach and former handball player.

Tiselj led Slovenia Men, Slovenia Women, Montenegro Women, Celje Pivovarna Laško, RK Gorenje Velenje, KIF Vejen, Budućnost, Krim Ljubljana, HCM Baia Mare or DVSC most recently.

International coaching achievements

Club
EHF Champions League – women:
Winner: 2001, 2003
EHF Champions Trophy – women:
Winner: 2003

National team
European Championship – men's tournament: 
Silver Medalist: 2004
Summer Olympics – men's tournament: 
Eleventh: 2004

Personal life
He is married to Damjana, with whom he has two children. Tone Tiselj is a professor of physical education. He loves Italian.

References

1961 births
Living people
Slovenian male handball players
Slovenian handball coaches
Slovenian expatriate sportspeople in Denmark
Slovenian expatriate sportspeople in Montenegro
Slovenian expatriate sportspeople in Romania
Slovenian expatriate sportspeople in Hungary